Čavoglave is a village in Dalmatian Hinterland, Croatia with a population of 190. It is part of the Ružić municipality of the Šibenik-Knin County, in the region of Dalmatia. It is located between the mountains Svilaja and Moseća, next to the source of the Čikola river. The southern edge of the village passes the D56 highway

Although the village is not usually a tourist destination, The village has started to gain popularity due to the famous Croatian nationalist folk rock song "Bojna Čavoglave".

Population 
According to the data on the official website of the municipality, Čavoglave has 190 inhabitants.

History 
During the Croatian War of Independence in 1991, Čavoglave was on the very front line, but they were never occupied. A large number of locals took part in the fight against Krajina Serbs. Čavoglave was popularized by Thompson's song "Bojna Čavoglave". Čavoglave is also Thompson's birthplace. He built the Church of Croatian Martyrs there at his own expense, dedicated to Croatian Army soldiers and civilians who died during the war. There is an annual fund raising concert in honor of Victory and Homeland Thanksgiving Day in Čavoglave.

Celebrities 

 Marko Perković (born 1966), Croatian musician.
 Ante Dabro (born 1938), Australian painter originally from Čavoglave.

References

External links

Sto tisuća ljudi s Thompsonom u Čavoglavama na pučkoj proslavi (FOTOGALERIJA) 

Populated places in Šibenik-Knin County
Tourist attractions in Šibenik-Knin County